Everett Christian School (ECS) is a private Christian school in Everett, Washington, United States.  Established in 1926, it is run by the parents of its students, and provides education from preschool through the eighth grade. Everett Christian School's colors are blue and white, and their mascot is a Badger.  

Everett Christian School was established in 1926 by parents as the Society of Christian Schools in Everett.  Since 1926, ECS has been educating children from Christian homes based in a Reformed Christian tradition. Everett Christian School participates in the Tri-County League in the sports of soccer, basketball and track & field. ECS is an approved institution of academic learning by the State of Washington and is accredited through the Christian Schools International.  Everett Christian is also a member of the groups WFIS and Northwest Christian School International. Everett Christian School has between 60 and 100 students (K-8) on average with a faculty to student ratio of 1 to 14.

The Everett Christian School parents, faculty, and staff believe the Bible teaches that God established a special relationship (covenant) with Christians.  Because of that relationship, Christians participate in this special relationship with God in all aspects of their lives.

The stated purpose of the ECS is to confront students with the important realities of life, so they may learn how to evaluate them in relation to the principles taught in the Christian Bible.

External links
Everett Christian School

Christian schools in Washington (state)
Private elementary schools in Washington (state)
Nondenominational Christian schools in the United States
Educational institutions established in 1926
Education in Everett, Washington
Schools in Snohomish County, Washington
Private middle schools in Washington (state)
1926 establishments in Washington (state)